Foster, Washington was a former community in King County in the U.S. state of Washington. Today, after being annexed in 1989, Foster's former area is a part of the city of Tukwila. 

A post office called Foster was established in 1903, and remained in operation until 1907. The community was named after Joseph Foster, an early settler. 

Besides the post office, at one time it had a school. In the 19th century, there was a Foster Ferry Landing on the Duwamish River near where today South 56th Street crosses the river and the Green River Trail. There was a Foster Station on the Puget Sound Electric Railway (the "Interurban") at roughly the location of today's Tukwila Park and Ride.

References

Ghost towns in King County, Washington
Ghost towns in Washington (state)